De Kievit is a smock mill in Menaam, Friesland, Netherlands which was built in 1802. The mill has been restored to working order. It is listed as a Rijksmonument.

History
De Kievit was built in 1802 to drain or pump water into the  Berikumerpolder as required. In 1986 it was sold to the Stichting Molens in Menaldumadeel. The mill was restored to working order between 1992 and 1995. It no longer drains the polder, but pumps water in a circuit for demonstration purposes. The mill is listed as a Rijksmonument, number 28578.

Description

De Kievit is what the Dutch describe as a Grondzeiler. It is a two-storey smock mill on a single-storey base. There is no stage, the sails reaching almost to ground level. The mill is winded by tailpole and winch. The smock and cap are thatched. The sails are Common sails. The sails are carried on a cast-iron windshaft, which was cast by Gieterij Hardinxveld-Giessendam in 1987. It also carries the brake wheel which has 44 cogs. This drives the wallower (25 cogs) at  the top of the upright shaft. At the bottom of the upright shaft there are two crown wheels The upper crown wheel, which has 35 cogs drives an Archimedes' screw via a crown wheel. This screw was used to pump water into the polder. The lower crown wheel, which has 35 cogs, drives a gearwheel with 32 cogs on the axle of an Archimedes' screw, which was used to drain the polder. The screw is  diameter. It is inclined at 10°. Each revolution of the screw lifts  of water.

Public access
De Kievit is open to the public at any time it is working.

References

Windmills in Friesland
Windmills completed in 1802
Smock mills in the Netherlands
Windpumps in the Netherlands
Agricultural buildings in the Netherlands
Rijksmonuments in Friesland
Octagonal buildings in the Netherlands